Melanie Cole Moffatt (born July 27, 1968) is a Canadian former competitive ice dancer. With Michael Farrington, she is the 1988 Golden Spin of Zagreb champion, 1988 Skate Canada International bronze medalist, and 1988 Canadian national bronze medalist. The two competed at the 1988 Winter Olympics in Calgary, finishing 16th.

Career 
As a child, Cole trained at the Newmarket Figure Skating Club.

Skating with Donald Godfrey, she became the Canadian national novice champion in 1984. The two finished seventh at the 1985 World Junior Championships, which took place in December 1984 in Colorado Springs, Colorado.

Cole and her next partner, Martin Smith, placed fourth at the 1986 World Junior Championships in December 1985 in Sarajevo and won the Canadian national junior title the same season. The following season, they competed on the senior level, placing 8th at the 1986 Skate America.

In 1987, Cole teamed up with Michael Farrington at the Upper Canada Skating Club. In their first season together, they won bronze at the Canadian Championships and were named in Canada's Olympic team. They finished 16th at the 1988 Winter Olympics, which took place in February in Calgary, Alberta. In March, they placed 15th at the 1988 World Championships in Budapest, Hungary.

Cole/Farrington competed one more season together, winning gold at the 1988 Golden Spin of Zagreb and bronze at the 1988 Skate Canada International. Cole decided to retire from competition in 1989, saying in a 2011 interview that skating was "too expensive" and "I was done and ready to move on. I had no hard feelings or regrets."

Cole Moffatt joined the York Regional Police in 1990.

In 2011, she was inducted into the Newmarket Sports Hall of Fame.

Results

With Farrington

With Smith

With Godfrey

References

1968 births
Canadian female ice dancers
Figure skaters at the 1988 Winter Olympics
Living people
Olympic figure skaters of Canada
Sportspeople from Newmarket, Ontario
Sportspeople from Ontario